Group A of the 2019 FIFA Women's World Cup took place from 7 to 17 June 2019. The group consisted of hosts France, Nigeria, Norway and South Korea. The top two teams, France and Norway, along with the third-placed team, Nigeria (as one of the four best third-placed teams), advanced to the round of 16.

Teams

Notes

Standings

In the round of 16:
 The winners of Group A, France, advanced to play the third-placed team of Group C, Brazil.
 The runners-up of Group A, Norway, advanced to play the runners-up of Group C, Australia.
 The third-placed team of Group A, Nigeria, advanced to play the winners of Group B, Germany (as one of the four best third-placed teams).

Matches
All times listed are local, CEST (UTC+2).

France vs South Korea

Norway vs Nigeria

Nigeria vs South Korea

France vs Norway

Nigeria vs France

South Korea vs Norway

Discipline
Fair play points would have been used as tiebreakers in the group if the overall and head-to-head records of teams were tied, or if teams had the same record in the ranking of third-placed teams. These were calculated based on yellow and red cards received in all group matches as follows:
first yellow card: minus 1 point;
indirect red card (second yellow card): minus 3 points;
direct red card: minus 4 points;
yellow card and direct red card: minus 5 points;

Only one of the above deductions were applied to a player in a single match.

References

External links
 
 2019 FIFA Women's World Cup Group A, FIFA.com

2019 FIFA Women's World Cup
France at the 2019 FIFA Women's World Cup
South Korea at the 2019 FIFA Women's World Cup
Norway at the 2019 FIFA Women's World Cup
Nigeria at the 2019 FIFA Women's World Cup